Horsfieldia iryaghedhi is a species of plant in the family Myristicaceae. It is endemic to Sri Lanka.

Culture
Known as "ruk - රුක්" in Sinhala.

In Theravada Buddhism, this plant is said to have used as the tree for achieved enlightenment, or Bodhi by sixteenth buddha called "Piyadassi - පියදස්සි". The plant is known as කුකුධ  (Kukudha) in Sanskrit.

References

iryaghedhi
Endemic flora of Sri Lanka
Critically endangered flora of Asia
Taxonomy articles created by Polbot